Govardhan Mangilal Sharma is a member of the 13th Maharashtra Legislative Assembly. He represents the Akola-West Assembly Constituency. He belongs to the Bharatiya Janata Party.

He is the senior leader of Bharatiya Janata Party in Akola district and he has been continuously winning Akola West counsituency since 1995.

References

Maharashtra MLAs 2014–2019
People from Akola
Living people
Bharatiya Janata Party politicians from Maharashtra
1964 births
Maharashtra MLAs 2019–2024